The A47 autoroute is a  highway in central France.  Completed in 1983 it connects Givors  (Lyon) to Saint-Étienne. It also serves the suburbs south-west of Lyon and east of Saint-Étienne.

Characteristics
 Toll free motorway
 2x2 lanes
 45 km long

History
 1953 and 1962: Opening of the central section between Saint-Chamond and Rive-de-Gier (current Junction 11).
 1970: Opening of an extension to Givors. In Givors, A47 is built on the site of an old road, which makes it run close to neighbouring buildings creating noise pollution.
 1983: Opening of the short section between Givors and the junction with the A7 and A46 autoroutes.  As a result, Lyon and St-Etienne are linked totally by motorway from beginning to end.
 1991: Opening of the St-Chamond by-pass. The old A47 through St-Chamond was re-numbered the D288 (expressway).
 1998: For the Football World Cup the section between St-Chamond and St-Etienne was widened to 2x3 lanes but this section is numbered the RN88.

Future
There are plans to transform sections of the A47 into an urban boulevard if the A45 to Lyon and Saint-Etienne, bypassing Givors, is built.

Junctions

External links

A47 autoroute in Saratlas

A47